Amaleh may refer to:
 Amaleh-ye Olya, Kermanshah Province
 Amaleh-ye Sofla, Kermanshah Province
 Amaleh Seyf, Khuzestan Province
 Amaleh-ye Teymur, Khuzestan Province